William Owen  (1769-1825) was an English portrait painter known for his portraits of society figures such as Pitt the Younger and George, Prince of Wales (later King George IV).

Early life
William Owen was born at 13 Broad Street, Ludlow, Shropshire in 1769 and was baptised on 3 November in Ludlow Parish Church. Owen's father, Jeremiah Owen, had trained for the church but instead chose to follow in his father's profession and took over the family barber shop which he later expanded into a stationary and bookshop. Owen found his talent at a young age, and would frequently be found sketching the scenery of his surrounding area, his first identifiable work being a drawing of Ludlow Castle, which is thought to have been given to Margaret Maskelyne, Lady Clive (1735-1817).

Career 
In 1786 Owen moved to London, where he was apprenticed to the coach painter Charles Cotton, RA (1728–1798).This position was most likely arranged by his uncle, who was butler to the scholar and art theorist Richard Payne Knight, who lived near Ludlow. It appears that Owen was drawn to figure painting from the outset, and after copying a portrait by Sir Joshua Reynolds of the much admired actress Mary Robinson (better known as 'Perdita'), he was sent on the recommendation of Reynolds to the Royal Academy Schools in 1791.

By 1794 Owen had moved out of his lodgings with Cotton on Gate Street and into a new to studio at No.211 Piccadilly where he remained for two years before moving to No.5 Coventry Street, Haymarket. It is whilst living here that he presumably came into contact with future wife Lener Leaf, whose father worked in Haymarket as a shoe maker.

By 1797 Owen was working as a studio assistant to John Hoppner, who by this point was struggling to keep up with the demand for copies of his portraits. Owen was clearly also experiencing some success in his own right, for in the same year he painted Lener, along with her younger sister, and exhibited the portrait at Somerset House – the then location of Royal Academy exhibitions, receiving a great deal of praise and encouragement. Owen married Lener later that year on 2 December and their son William was born soon after.

In 1800 Owen and his family moved to Pimlico, although choosing to maintain his recently acquired studio at No.51 Leicester Square, next door to the house in which Sir Joshua Reynolds lived. This remained Owen's studio until he became too ill and moved out in 1818. 
The year 1797/8 was perhaps the most significant in Owen's career as a painter; in 1797 he painted the then Prime Minister William Pitt the Younger which he exhibited the following year along with a portrait of the Lord Chancellor Alexander Wedderburn.

Royal appointment 
In 1810 following the death of John Hoppner (1758–1810), Owen was appointed portrait painter to the Prince of Wales, later George IV (1762–1830). Unfortunately the prince never gave a sitting and instead Owen had to rely on a number of head sketches by his predecessor Hoppner to create a likeness. In 1813 Owen was offered a knighthood however he declined.

Decline in health 
In 1818 Owen left his house in Pimlico and his studio in Leicester Square and moved to Bruton Street, most probably due to his slowly decreasing health, his eagerness however remained unscathed and he exhibited eight works at the Royal Academy the following year. In 1819 Owen travelled to Bath to meet a respectable man of medicine named Mr Hicks, however this seemed to have no positive effect and he soon returned to London. By 1820 Owen was confined to his bed where, with the exception of a brief six months spent in Chelsea towards the end of 1824, he remained until his death five years later.

Death 
In 1825 Owen died after being accidentally poisoned by an overdose of 'Barclay's Drops' – a mixture of aniseed, camphor and opium. Owen was very ill at the time, being confined to his bedroom and unable to move his limbs, relying on a draught medicine to aid his recovery. When the draught ran out his cook was sent to fetch another bottle, along with a bottle of Barclay's Drops, however the chemist labelled the two bottles wrongly and as a result Owen took a fatal dose of the opium-based medicine, dying hours later.
At the inquest on 13 March 1825 the following verdict was reached by the jury:

Owen was buried on 19 March 1825 at Saint Luke's, Chelsea, in a private ceremony attended by family and close friends, including Sir Thomas Lawrence, Sir Richard Westmacott, Thomas Phillips and 'Thompson' – most probably Thomas Clement Thompson.

References

External links

 
 Profile on Royal Academy of Arts Collections

1769 births
1825 deaths
18th-century English painters
English male painters
19th-century English painters
Royal Academicians
19th-century English male artists
18th-century English male artists